Bup is a Backup system written in Python. It uses several formats from Git but is capable of handling very large files like operating system images. It has block-based deduplication and optional par2-based error correction.

History 
Bup development began in 2010 and was accepted to Debian the same year.

Design 
Bup uses the git packfile format writing packfiles directly, avoiding garbage collection.

Availability 
Bup is available from source and notably part of the following distributions
 Debian
 Ubuntu
 Arch Linux
 pkgsrc (NetBSD etc.)

See also 
 List of backup software
 Comparison of backup software

References

External links 
 bup website on GitHub

2010 software
Free backup software
Backup software for Linux
Python (programming language) software